Dean Tracy (born January 14, 1985) is an American male  track cyclist, riding for the national team. He competed in the team sprint event at the 2011 UCI Track Cycling World Championships.

References

External links
 

1985 births
Living people
Place of birth missing (living people)
American track cyclists
American male cyclists
Pan American Games silver medalists for the United States
Cyclists at the 2011 Pan American Games
Pan American Games medalists in cycling
Medalists at the 2011 Pan American Games